Megachile creusa is a species of bee in the family Megachilidae. It was described by Charles Thomas Bingham in 1898.

References

Creusa
Insects described in 1898